Dr. Augusto Roberto Fuster Airport  simply known as Pedro Juan Caballero Airport is a small airport, officially an aerodrome, according to Paraguayan aviation authorities, that serves the city of Pedro Juan Caballero in the Amambay Department of Paraguay.

Airlines and destinations
No scheduled flights operate at this airport.

See also

 List of airports in Paraguay
 Transport in Paraguay

References

External links
 Direccion Nacional de Aeronautica Civil - Airports of Paraguay

Airports in Paraguay
Amambay Department